Ayuthia spectabile, commonly known as the milky cicada or white ghost cicada, is a cicada species.

Distribution 
Found in Southeast Asia. The species has been reported from It was described by William Lucas Distant in 1919.

Description

References

Tosenini
Insects described in 1919